The following articles cover the presidential trips made by Joe Biden as President of the United States:

 List of international presidential trips made by Joe Biden
 List of presidential trips made by Joe Biden (2021)
 List of presidential trips made by Joe Biden (2022)
 List of presidential trips made by Joe Biden (2023)

See also
 Presidency of Joe Biden

Presidency of Joe Biden
Biden, Joe
2020s in the United States
Presidential trips